Bhadar River is a river in the Saurashtra peninsula, in the Western Indian state of Gujarat. It flows south from its origin through Jasdan, then turns south-west and generally west until it empties into the Arabian Sea near Porbandar.

References

Rivers of Gujarat
Rivers of India